The 2011 ModSpace American Le Mans Monterey presented by Patrón was held at Mazda Raceway Laguna Seca on September 17, 2011. It was the eighth round of the 2011 American Le Mans Series season. The event also marked the first time since the 1999 event to have two sponsors in the event title.

Qualifying

Qualifying Result
Pole position winners in each class are marked in bold.

Race

Race result
Class winners in bold.  Cars failing to complete 70% of their class winner's distance are marked as Not Classified (NC).

References

Monterey
Monterey Sports Car Championships